This is a list of members of the Electoral College, known as "electors", who cast ballots to elect the President of the United States and Vice President of the United States in the 2016 election. There are 538 electors from the 50 states and the District of Columbia. On Monday December 19, 2016, they formally elected Donald Trump of New York and Mike Pence of Indiana to the presidency and vice presidency respectively.

While every state except Nebraska and Maine chooses its electors by statewide vote, many states require that one elector be designated for each congressional district. These electors are chosen by each party before the general election. A vote for that party then confirms their position. In all states except Nebraska and Maine, the electors are winner-take-all. In Maine and Nebraska within each congressional district one elector is allocated by popular vote; the states' remaining two electors, representing the two U.S. Senate seats, are winner-take-both. Except where otherwise noted, such designations refer to the elector's residence in that district rather than election by the voters of the district. Ultimately, Donald Trump received 304 electoral votes and Hillary Clinton 227, as two faithless electors defected from Trump and five defected from Clinton. Four faithless electors were from Washington (defected from Clinton), two from Texas (defected from Trump) and one from Hawaii (defected from Clinton).

Alabama

Electors: 9, pledged to vote for Donald Trump for President and Mike Pence for Vice President

 Perry O. Hooper Jr., Pike Road, At-large
 Grady H. Thornton, Birmingham, At-large
 Frank Burt Jr., Bay Minette, CD1
 Will B. Sellers, Montgomery, CD2
 James Eldon Wilson, Montgomery, CD3
 Tim Wadsworth, Arley, CD4
 Isabelle Rivel, CD4.5
 J. Elbert Peters, Huntsville, CD5
 Mary Sue McClurkin, Indian Springs, CD6
 Robert A. Cusanelli, Carrollton, CD7

Alaska

Electors: 3, pledged to vote for the nominees of the Republican Party of the State of Alaska

 Sean Parnell, Palmer — 10th Governor of Alaska
 Jacqueline Tupou, Juneau
 Edward John Herrmann, Juneau
 Carolyn Leman, Anchorage

Arizona

Electors: 11, pledged to vote for Donald Trump for President and Mike Pence for Vice President

 J. Foster Morgan, Glendale — youngest elector at 19
 Walter Begay Jr., Kayenta
 Bruce Ash, Tucson – national committeeman 
 Sharon Giese, Mesa
 James O'Connor, Scottsdale
 Jerry Hayden, Scottsdale
 Robert Graham, Phoenix – state party chairman
 Edward Robson, Phoenix
 Carole Joyce, Phoenix
 Alberto Gutier, Phoenix
 Jane Pierpoint Lynch, Phoenix

Arkansas

Electors: 6, pledged to vote for Donald Trump for President and Mike Pence for Vice President

 Jonathan Barnett
 Jonelle Fulmer
 Keith Gibson
 Tommy Land
 John Nabholz
 Sharon Wright

California

Electors: 55, voted for Hillary Clinton for President and Tim Kaine for Vice President
 Dustin R. Reed, Concord
 Nathaniel O. Fridland, Orange County
 Javier Gonzalez, San Jose
 Shawn E. Terris, Ventura
 John M. Ryan, San Rafael
 Mark W. Headley, Berkeley
 Gail R. Teton-Landis, Santa Barbara
 Faith A. Garamendi, Davis
 Ana A. Huerta, Bakersfield
 Marie S. Torres, Hacienda Heights
 Kathleen R. Scott, Lincoln
 Donna M. Ireland, Pleasanton
 Robert S. Torres, Pomona
 Timothy J. Farley, Martinez
 Christine T. Kehoe, San Diego
 Dorothy N. Vann, Long Beach
 Analea J. Patterson, Sacramento
 Vinzenz J. Koller, Carmel – had indicated that he was undecided, unsuccessfully sued California over law forcing electors to vote along party lines
 David S. Warmuth, Pasadena
 Janine V. Bera, Elk Grove
 Andrew R. Krakoff, Orinda
 Karen D. Waters, Inglewood
 Sandra M. Aduna, Laguna Woods
 Katherine A. Lyon, Coronado
 Shirley N. Weber, San Diego
 Saundra G. Andrews, Oakland
 John P. MacMurray, La Habra
 Denise B. Wells, Victorville
 Jane C. Block, Riverside
 Sheldon Malchicoff, Westlake Village
 Gregory H. Willenborg, Los Angeles
 Ed Buck, West Hollywood
 Nury Martinez, San Fernando
 Laurence S. Zakson, Los Angeles
 Francine P. Busby, Cardiff
 Gwen Moore, Los Angeles
 Laphonza R. Butler, Los Angeles
 Cathy A. Morris, Rancho Cucamonga
 Benjamin Cardenas, Montebello
 Stephen J. Natoli, Visalia
 Jacki M. Cisneros, Los Angeles
 Mark A. Olbert, San Carlos
 Raymond L. Cordova, Garden Grove
 Christine Pelosi, San Francisco – signed a letter demanding an intelligence briefing on the alleged Russian hacking
 Steven D. Diebert, Fresno
 Carmen O. Perez, Long Beach
 James A. Donahue, El Cerrito
 Celine G. Purcell, Redwood City
 Patrick F. Drinan, Escondido
 Andres Ramos, Elk Grove
 Susan Eggman, Stockton
 Olivia A. Reyes-Becerra, Stanford
 Eileen Feinstein Mariano, San Francisco
 Priscilla G. Richardson, Cathedral City
 Natalie P. Fortman, Valencia
 Steve J. Spinner, Atherton

Colorado

Electors: 9, voted for Hillary Clinton for President and Tim Kaine for Vice President

 Celeste Landry, Boulder – replaced Micheal Baca, Denver, who was removed as an elector after voting for John Kasich
 Terry Phillips, Louisville
 Mary Beth Corsentino, Pueblo
 Jerad Sutton, Greeley – had indicated he would not vote for Hillary Clinton
 Robert Nemanich, Colorado Springs – had in early December not planned to vote for Hillary Clinton
 Amy Drayer, Greenwood Village
 Ann Knollman, Arvada
 Sen. Rollie Heath, Boulder
 Hon. Polly Baca, Denver – had indicated she would cast her vote for an alternative Republican candidate

Connecticut

Electors: 7, pledged to vote for Hillary Clinton for President and Tim Kaine for Vice President

 Barbara Gordon, West Hartford
 Ellen Nurse, Hartford
 Edward Piazza, New Haven
 Christopher Rosario, Bridgeport
 Suzanne Kammerman, Shelton
 Robert Godfrey, Danbury
 Steven Jones, Tolland

Delaware

Electors: 3, pledged to vote for Hillary Clinton for President and Tim Kaine for Vice President

 Lynn Fuller
 Lydia York
 Gabriela de Brito
 Abigal Nevin
 Linda Cavanaugh

District of Columbia

Electors: 3, pledged to vote for Hillary Clinton for President and Tim Kaine for Vice President

 Anita Bonds – signed a letter demanding an intelligence briefing on the alleged Russian hacking
 Jack Evans
 Franklin Garcia

Florida

Electors: 29, pledged to vote for Donald Trump for President and Mike Pence for Vice President

 Tony Ledbetter
 Pam Bondi — 37th Attorney General of Florida
 Sharon Day
 Adrien "Bo" Rivard
 Larry Ahern
 Brian Ballard
 Kristy Banks
 Michael Barnett
 Lizbeth Benacquisto
 Robin Bernstein
 John Browning
 Dena DeCamp
 Nick DiCeglie
 Jeremy Evans
 John Falconetti
 Peter Feaman
 Kat Gates-Skipper
 Joe Gruters
 Debbie Hannifan
 Blaise Ingoglia
 Mike Moberley
 Susan Moore
 Joe Negron
 Clint Pate
 Ray Rodrigues
 Carlos Trujillo
 Robert Watkins
 Susie Wiles
 Christian Ziegler

Georgia

Electors: 16, pledged to vote for Donald Trump for President and Mike Pence for Vice President

 Bruce Allen Azevedo
 Brian K Burdette
 Lott Harris Dill
 John David Elliott
 James Randolph Evans
 Bobbie D. Frantz
 Linda D. Herren
 Rachel Blackstone Little
 Deborah M. McCord
 Michael Neil McNeely
 Mary L. Padgett
 Neil L. Pruitt
 Joshua Kirk Shook
 Frank B. Strickland
 John Padgett – replaced Baoky Nguyen Vu, who resigned
 John B. White

Hawaii

Electors: 4, pledged to vote for Hillary Clinton for President and Tim Kaine for Vice President
Clinton received three votes and Bernie Sanders received one for President
Kaine received three votes and Elizabeth Warren received one for Vice President

Electors 
 John Bickel
 Janice Bond
 Marie "Dolly" Strazar
 David Mulinix, voted for Bernie Sanders and Elizabeth Warren

First alternates 
 Kainoa Kaumeheiwa-Rego
 Eileen McKee
 Michael Golojuch Sr.
 Yvonne Lau

Second alternates 
 Carolyn Golojuch
 Julie Patten
 Michele Golojuch
 Leo Caries

Idaho

Electors: 4, pledged to vote for Donald Trump for President and Mike Pence for Vice PresidentTwo (Bangerter and Smyser) were replaced on the Electoral College, as federal employees cannot be electors

 Layne Bangerter
 Caleb Lakey
 Jennifer Locke
 Melinda Smyser

Illinois

Electors: 20, pledged to vote for Hillary Clinton for President and Tim Kaine for Vice President

 Toni Preckwinkle
 Carrie Austin
 Silvana Tabares
 Jesús "Chuy" García
 Pam Cullerton
 Nancy Shepherdson – signed a letter demanding an intelligence briefing on the alleged Russian hacking
 Vera Davis
 William Marovitz – signed a letter demanding an intelligence briefing on the alleged Russian hacking
 Barbara Flynn Currie
 John R. Daley
 Michelle Mussman
 Lauren Beth Gash, Highland Park
 Kevin Duffy Blackburn, Joliet
 Jerry Costello, Belleville
 Carol Ammons
 Mark Guethle, North Aurora
 Flint Taylor, McLeansboro
 John Nelson, Rockford
 Don Johnston, Rock Island

Indiana

Electors: 11, pledged to vote for Donald Trump for President and Mike Pence for Vice President

 Stephanie Beckley, Jamestown
 Daniel Bortner, Bedford
 Laura Campbell, Carmel
 Jeff Cardwell, Indianapolis
 Donald L. Hayes, Jasper
 Randall Kirkpatrick, Ligonier
 Ethan E. Manning, Peru
 Macy Kelly Mitchell, Indianapolis 
 Edwin J. Simcox, Fishers
 Kevin Steen, Muncie
 Chuck Williams, Valparaiso

Iowa

Electors: 6, pledged to vote for Donald Trump for President and Mike Pence for Vice President

 James Whitmer
 Don Kass
 Dylan Keller
 Alan Braun
 Kurt Brown
 Polly Granzow

Kansas

Electors: 6, pledged to vote for Donald Trump for President and Mike Pence for Vice President

 Ashley J. McMillan, Concordia – state party vice chairwoman
 Helen Van Etten, Topeka – national committeewoman
 Mark Kahrs, Wichita – national committeeman
 Ron Estes, Wichita – Kansas State Treasurer
 Clayton L. Barker, Leawood – state party executive director
 Kelly Arnold, Wichita – state party chairman

Kentucky

Electors: 8, pledged to vote for Donald Trump for President and Mike Pence for Vice President

 Jim Skaggs 
 David Disponett
 Robert Duncan
 Michael Carter
 Scott Lasley
 Walter Reichert
 Mary Singleton
 Troy Sheldon

Louisiana

Electors: 8, pledged to vote for Donald Trump for President and Mike Pence for Vice President

Electors 
 Chris Trahan, CD1
 Lloyd Harsch, CD2
 Charles Buckels, CD3
 Louis Avalone, CD4
 Kay Katz, CD5
 Lennie Rhys, CD6
 Garret Monti, At-large
 Scott Wilfong, At-large

Alternates 
 Candy Maness, CD1
 Jennifer Madsen, CD2
 Christian Gil, CD3
 Constance Diane Long, CD4
 Verne Breland, CD5
 Glenda Pollard, CD6
 John Batt, At-large
 Raymond Griffin, At-large

Maine

Electors: 4

Democratic Party 
3, pledged to vote for Hillary Clinton for President and Tim Kaine for Vice President

 (1st) Diane Denk, Kennebunk
 (At-large) David Bright, Dixmont – voted for Bernie Sanders, then voted for Hillary Clinton in a second round of voting
 (At-large) Sam Shapiro, Winslow

Republican Party 
1, pledged to vote for Donald Trump for President and Mike Pence for Vice President

 (2nd) Richard A. Bennett, Oxford

Maryland

Electors: 10, pledged to vote for Hillary Clinton for President and Tim Kaine for Vice President

 Lesley Israel
 Robert Leonard
 Lillian Holmes
 Salome Peters
 Hagner Mister
 Claudia Martin
 Courtney Watson – signed a letter demanding an intelligence briefing on the alleged Russian hacking
 Karen Britto
 Susan Ness
 Wayne Rogers

Massachusetts

Electors: 11, pledged to vote for Hillary Clinton for President and Tim Kaine for Vice President

 Nazda Alam
 Mary Gail Cokkinias
 Marie Turley
 Dori Dean
 Donna Smith
 Cheryl Cumings
 Marc R. Pacheco
 Curtis Lemay
 Jason Palitsch
 Paul Yorkis
 Parwez Wahid

Michigan

Electors: 16, pledged to vote for Donald Trump for President and Mike Pence for Vice President

 John Haggard
 Jack Holmes
 Kelly Mitchell
 Judy Rapanos
 Henry Hatter
 Robert Weitt
 Wyckham Seelig
 Ross Ensign
 Michael Banerian 
 Brian Fairbrother
 Ken Crider
 Mary Vaughn
 Jim Rhoades — motorcycle lobbyist
 William Rauwerdink
 Hank Fuhs
 Joseph Guzman

Minnesota

Electors: 10, voted for Hillary Clinton for President and Tim Kaine for Vice President

 Fred Knudson, Owatonna
 Roger Gehrke, Eagan
 Marge Hoffa, Minnetonka
 Raymond Hess, Maplewood
 Jill Garcia, Minneapolis – replaced Muhammad Abdurrahman, faithless elector after he voted for Bernie Sanders and Tulsi Gabbard
 Betsy O'Berry, Ramsey
 Mike Wammer, Lake Eunice Township
 Mary Murphy, Hermantown
 Jules Goldstein, St. Paul
 Sherrie Pugh, Mound

Mississippi

Electors: 6, pledged to vote for Donald Trump for President and Mike Pence for Vice President

 Ann Hebert
 Joe F. Sanderson Jr.
 Bradley R. White
 J. Kelley Williams
 William G. Yates Jr.
 Wirt Yerger

Missouri

Electors: 10, pledged to vote for Donald Trump for President and Mike Pence for Vice President

 Tim Dreste (1st)
 Jan DeWeese (2nd)
 Hector Maldonado (3rd) – says he will vote for Trump stating: "I took an oath once to become a U.S. citizen (...) on August 14, 1995, that was the first oath that I have taken to support the U.S. Constitution. A year later I took the oath again, to support the duties of being an officer in the U.S. Army. This was the third oath that I have taken to execute what I promised to do."
 Sherry Kuttenkuler (4th)
 Casey Crawford (5th)
 Tom Brown (6th)
 Cherry Warren (7th)
 Scott Clark (8th)
 Al Rotskoff
 Susie Johnson

Montana

Electors: 3, pledged to vote for Donald Trump for President and Mike Pence for Vice President

Electors 
 Thelma Baker
 Nancy Ballance
 Dennis Scranton

Alternates 
 Vondene Kopetski
 Becky Stockton
 Thomas Tuck

Nebraska

Electors: 5, pledged to vote for Donald Trump for President and Mike Pence for Vice President

 Craig Safranek, Merna 
 Chuck Conrad, Hastings 
 John Dinkel, Norfolk 
 Phil Belin, Omaha 
 Paul Burger, Kearney

Nevada

Electors: 6, pledged to vote for Hillary Clinton for President and Tim Kaine for Vice President

 Dayananda Prabhu Rachakonda
 Larry Jackson
 Joetta Brown
 Paul James Catha II
 Greg Gardella
 Teresa Benitez-Thompson

New Hampshire

Electors: 4, pledged to vote for Hillary Clinton for President and Tim Kaine for Vice President

The only all-female slate of electors, all four of whom are the first Democratic women to hold their elected offices

 Terie Norelli – signed a letter demanding an intelligence briefing on the alleged Russian hacking
 Bev Hollingworth – signed a letter demanding an intelligence briefing on the alleged Russian hacking
 Dudley Dudley – signed a letter demanding an intelligence briefing on the alleged Russian hacking
 Carol Shea-Porter – signed a letter demanding an intelligence briefing on the alleged Russian hacking

New Jersey

Electors: 14, pledged to vote for Hillary Clinton for President and Tim Kaine for Vice President

 Alaa R. Abdelaziz, Paterson
 Tahsina Ahmed, Haledon — the first Bangladeshi-American female to hold elected office in the nation
 Anthony Cureton, Englewood
 Lizette Delgado-Polanco, Ewing
 Edward Farmer, Piscataway
 Christopher D. James, East Orange
 LeRoy J. Jones Jr., East Orange
 Retha R. Onitiri, Clarksburg
 Marlene Prieto, Secaucus
 Ronald G. Rios, Carteret
 Hetty M. Rosenstein, South Orange
 Kelly Steward Maer, Manasquan
 Mary Ann Wardlow, Lawnside
 Heriberta Loretta Winters, Williamstown

New Mexico

Electors: 5, pledged to vote for Hillary Clinton for President and Tim Kaine for Vice President

 Roxanne Allen, Albuquerque – Democratic ward chairwoman
 Noyola Padilla Archibeque, Las Vegas – chairwoman of the San Miguel Federation of Democratic Women
 John Padilla, Albuquerque – Bernie Sanders delegate to the 2016 Democratic National Convention and Democratic ward chairman
 Lorraine Spradling, Los Lunas – grassroots organizer
 E. Paul Torres, Isleta Pueblo

New York

Electors: 29, pledged to vote for Hillary Clinton for President and Tim Kaine for Vice President

 William J. "Bill" Clinton – 42nd President of the United States
 Andrew M. Cuomo — 56th Governor of New York
 Kathy C. Hochul — Lieutenant Governor of New York
 Thomas P. DiNapoli — 54th Comptroller of New York
 Eric T. Schneiderman — 65th Attorney General of New York
 Carl E. Heastie
 Andrea Stewart-Cousins
 Bill de Blasio — 109th Mayor of New York City
 Letitia A. James
 Scott M. Stringer
 Melissa Mark-Viverito
 Byron W. Brown
 Christine C. Quinn
 Basil A. Smikle, Jr.
 Melissa Sklarz
 Mario F. Cilento
 Rhonda Weingarten
 George K. Gresham
 Daniel F. Donohue
 Stuart H. Appelbaum
 Gary S. LaBarbera
 Lovely A. Warren
 Stephanie A. Miner
 Katherine M. Sheehan
 Anastasia M. Somoza
 Sandra Ung
 Rubén Díaz Jr.
 Hazel L. Ingram — the oldest elector, at 93
 Rachel D. Gold

North Carolina

Electors: 15, voted for Donald Trump for President and Mike Pence for Vice President

Linda Harper
Charles Staley
Karen Kozel
Martha Jenkins
Celeste Stanley
Donald Webb
Robert Muller
Jennifer Dunbar
Andrea Arterburn
Glenn Pinckney Sr.
Mark Delk
David Speight
Ann Sullivan
Lee Green
David Smudski

North Dakota

Electors: 3, pledged to vote for Donald Trump for President and Mike Pence for Vice President

 Leon Helland
 John Olson
 Duane Mutch – deceased
 Bev Clayburgh

Ohio

Electors: 18, pledged to vote for Donald Trump for President and Mike Pence for Vice President

 Marilyn Ashcraft
 Curt Braden
 Rob Scott – replaced Christina Hagan, who resigned position, possibly ineligible, being in the Ohio General Assembly
 Lee-Ann Johnson
 Ralph King
 Alex Triantafilou
 Mary Anne Christie
 Corey Schottenstein
 Jim Dicke II
 Cheryl Blakely
 Richard Jones
 Tom Coyne
 Judy Westbrock
 Leonard Hubert
 Tracey Winbush
 James Wert
 Brian Schottenstein
 Ed Crawford

Oklahoma

Electors: 7, pledged to vote for Donald Trump for President and Mike Pence for Vice President

 David Oldham
 Teresa Lyn Turner
 Mark Thomas
 Bobby Cleveland
 Lauree Elizabeth Marshall
 Charles W. Potts
 George W. Wiland, Jr.

Oregon

Electors: 7, pledged to vote for Hillary Clinton for President and Tim Kaine for Vice President

 Frank James Dixon, Portland
 Karen A. Packer, Newberg
 Austin Folnagy, Klamath Falls
 Leon H. Coleman, Aloha
 Harry W. "Sam" Sappington III, Albany
 Timothy Norman Powers Rowan, Portland
 Laura Gillpatrick, Eugene

Pennsylvania

Electors: 20, pledged to vote for Donald Trump for President and Mike Pence for Vice President 
 Bob Asher
 Mary Barket
 Robert Bozzuto
 Theodore "Ted" Christian
 Michael Downing
 Margaret Ferraro
 Robert Gleason
 Christopher Gleason
 Joyce Haas
 Ash Khare
 James McErlane
 Elstina Pickett
 Patricia Poprik
 Andrew Reilly
 Carol Sides
 Glora "Lee" Snover
 Richard Stewart
 Lawrence Tabas
 Christine Toretti
 Carolyn Bunny Welsh

Rhode Island

Electors: 4, pledged to vote for Hillary Clinton for President and Tim Kaine for Vice President

 Clay Pell – signed a letter demanding an intelligence briefing on the alleged Russian hacking
 Grace Diaz
 L. Susan Weiner
 Frank J. Montanaro

South Carolina

Electors: 9, voted for Donald Trump for President and Mike Pence for Vice President

 Glenn McCall
 Matt Moore
 Terry Hardesty
 Jim Ulmer
 Brenda Bedenbaugh
 Bill Conley
 Shery Smith
 Moye Graham
 Jerry Rovner

South Dakota

Electors: 3, pledged to vote for Donald Trump for President and Mike Pence for Vice President

 Marty Jackley — 30th Attorney General of South Dakota
 Dennis Daugaard — 32nd Governor of South Dakota
 Matt Michels — 38th Lieutenant Governor of South Dakota

Tennessee

Electors: 11, pledged to vote for Donald Trump for President and Mike Pence for Vice President

 Beth Scott Clayton Amos, Nashville, At-large – state executive committee member, member of the Board of the Estate Planning Council of Middle Tennessee
 Joey Jacobs, Brentwood, At-large – president and CEO of Acadia Healthcare
 Jason Mumpower, Bristol, CD1
 Susan Mills, Maryville, CD2
 Liz Holiway, Harriman, CD3
 Lynne Davis, Lascassas, CD4
 Tom Lawless, Nashville, CD5 – says he will vote for Trump stating: "Hell will freeze and we will be skating on the lava before I change. (...) He won the state and I have pledged and gave my word that that is what I would do. And I will not break it."
 Mike Callahan, Monterey, CD6
 Pat Allen, Clarksville, CD7
 Shannon Haynes, Alamo, CD8
 Drew Daniel, Memphis, CD9

Texas

Electors: 38, pledged to vote for Donald Trump for President and Mike Pence for Vice PresidentOne elector, Christopher Suprun, pledged not to vote for Donald TrumpRon Paul and John Kasich each received one vote for PresidentCarly Fiorina received one vote for Vice President

 Candace Noble, At-large
 Fred Farias, At-large 
 Marty Rhymes, CD1
 Thomas Moon, CD2
 Carol Sewell, CD3
 John E. Harper, CD4
 Sherrill Lenz, CD5
 Nicholas Ciggelakis, CD6
 Will Hickman, CD7
 Landon Estay, CD8
 Rex Lamb, CD9
 Rosemary Edwards, CD10
 Matt Stringer, CD11
 Debra Coffey, CD12 – replaced Shellie Surles, ruled ineligible
 Benona Love, CD13 – replaced Melissa Kalka, ruled ineligible
 Sherry Clark, CD14 – replaced Kenneth Clark, ruled ineligible
 Sandra Cararas, CD15
 David Thackston, CD16
 Robert Bruce, CD17
 Margie Forster, CD18
 Scott Mann, CD19
 Marian K. Stanko, CD20
 Curtis Nelson, CD21
 Tina Gibson, CD22
 Ken Muenzler, CD23
 Alexander Kim, CD24
 Virginia Abel, CD25
 John Dillard, CD26
 Tom Knight, CD27
 Marian Knowlton, CD28
 Rex Teter, CD29
 Christopher Suprun, CD30 – voted for John Kasich and Carly Fiorina; on May 14, 2016, at the state party convention in Dallas, per state party rule no. 39 on presidential electors, Suprun filed with the Chairman of the National Nominations Committee an affidavit in writing as to his commitment to vote for the Republican Party's nominees for President and Vice President, but later reneged on this commitment, stating in a New York Times op-ed that he would not vote for Trump
Jon Jewett, CD31
 Susan Fischer, CD32
 Lauren Byers, CD33
 William "Bill" Greene, CD34 – voted for Ron Paul and Mike Pence; on May 14, 2016, at the state party convention in Dallas, per state party rule no. 39 on presidential electors, Greene filed with the Chairman of the National Nominations Committee an affidavit in writing as to his commitment to vote for the Republican Party's nominees for President and Vice President. However, Greene testified before the Elections Committee in the Texas House of Representatives on March 27, 2017, his belief that "a constitutional oath supersedes any pledge (...) and my oath was to the Constitution of the State of Texas and the U.S. Constitution"
 Mary Lou Erben, CD35
 Janis Holt, CD 36 – replaced Arthur Sisneros, who resigned from the Electoral College rather than vote for Trump

Utah

Electors: 6, pledged to vote for Donald Trump for President and Mike Pence for Vice President

 Cherilyn Eagar
 Kris Kimball
 Jeremy Jenkins
 Peter Greathouse
 Chia-Chi Teng
 Richard Snelgrove

Vermont

Electors: 3, pledged to vote for Hillary Clinton for President and Tim Kaine for Vice President

 Peter Shumlin — 81st Governor of Vermont
 Martha Allen
 Tim Jerman

Virginia

Electors: 13, pledged to vote for Hillary Clinton for President and Tim Kaine for Vice President

 Bethany J. Rowland, Chesapeake
 Debra Stevens Fitzgerald, Harrisonburg
 James Harold Allen Boyd, Culpeper
 Jasper L. Hendricks, III, Pamplin
 Jeanette C. Sarver, Dublin
 K. James O'Connor, Jr., Manassas
 Kathy Stewart Shupe, Sterling
 Keith A. Scarborough, Woodbridge
 Lashrecse D. Aird, Petersburg
 Susan Johnson Rowland, Chesapeake
 Terry C. Frye, Bristol
 Virginia L. Peters, Alexandria
 Vivian J. Paige, Norfolk

Washington

Electors: 12, pledged to vote for Hillary Clinton for President and Tim Kaine for Vice President
Clinton received eight votes, Colin Powell received three and Faith Spotted Eagle received one
Kaine received eight votes and Elizabeth Warren, Susan Collins, Maria Cantwell and Winona LaDuke each received one for Vice President

Elizabeth Caldwell – voted for Clinton and Kaine
Dan Carpita – voted for Clinton and Kaine
Peter Bret Chiafalo – voted for Colin Powell and Elizabeth Warren
Levi Guerra – voted for Colin Powell and Maria Cantwell; had stated she planned to vote for a Republican "consensus candidate"
Eric Herde – voted for Clinton and Kaine
Joshua Ivey – voted for Clinton and Kaine
Esther John – voted for Colin Powell and Susan Collins
Julie Johnson – voted for Clinton and Kaine
Varisha Khan – voted for Clinton and Kaine
Chris Porter – voted for Clinton and Kaine
Robert Satiacum, Jr. – member of the Puyallup Tribe, refused to vote for Clinton and Kaine; voted for Faith Spotted Eagle and Winona LaDuke
Phillip Tyler – voted for Clinton and Kaine

West Virginia

Electors: 5, pledged to vote for Donald Trump for President and Mike Pence for Vice President

 Ron Foster
 Patrick Morrisey — 34th Attorney General of West Virginia
 Ann Urling
 Mac Warner
 Bill Cole

Wisconsin

Electors: 10, pledged to vote for Donald Trump for President and Mike Pence for Vice President

 Kim Travis, Williams Bay, CD1
 Kim Babler, Madison, CD2
 Brian Westrate, Fall Creek, CD3 – tweeted that he will vote for Donald Trump
 Brad Courtney, Whitefish Bay, CD4
 Kathy Kiernan, Richfield, CD5
 Dan Feyen, Fond du Lac, CD6
 Kevin Hermening, Wausau, CD7 – replacing Jim Miller, Hayward
 Bill Berglund, Sturgeon Bay, CD8
 Steve King, Janesville, At-large
 Mary Buestrin, River Hills, At-large

Wyoming

Electors: 3, pledged to vote for Donald Trump for President and Mike Pence for Vice President

 Bonnie Foster
 Teresa Richards
 Karl Allred

See also 

 Faithless electors in the 2016 United States presidential election
 Federalist Papers

References

External links
 Profiles of several electors

 
United States presidential electors, 2016
2016
Donald Trump-related lists